Adam Danielewicz (1846–1935) was a Polish statistician.

Publications
 Równania Ablowe oraz ich zastosowanie do wpisywania wielokątów foremnych w koło (1869)
 W kwestyi statystyki śmiertelności (1877)
 O układaniu tablic śmiertelności z powodu zamierzonego spisu ludności (1878)
 W przedmiocie badań tablic śmiertelności (1878)
 Zasady taryf ubezpieczeń życiowych (1878)
 Zabezpieczenie kapitałów przez częściowe oszczędności (1884)
 Z dziedziny statystyki matematycznej (1884)
 Ludność miasta Warszawy w obrazach graficznych. Według spisu jednodniowego z 1882 roku (1887)
 Warszawska śmiertelność według przyczyn śmierci (1889-1893)
 Przyczynek do metody Zeunera (1890)
 Wykup czy redukcya polis (1892)
 Podstawy matematyczne ubezpieczeń życiowych (1896)
 O metodzie najmniejszych kwadratów (1904)
 Zarys arytmetyki politycznej (1910, with Samuelem Dicksteinem)

References

 Biogramy uczonych polskich, Część I: Nauki społeczne, zeszyt 1: A-J, Wrocław 1983

1846 births
1936 deaths
19th-century Polish mathematicians
20th-century Polish mathematicians